Matthew Holmes (born 8 December 1993) is a British former cyclist, who competed as a professional from 2012 to 2022. In October 2020, he was named in the startlist for the 2020 Giro d'Italia.

Major results

2011
 2nd Overall Junior Tour of Wales
1st  Mountains classification
2012
 2nd Road race, National Under–23 Road Championships
2016
 1st  Overall Totnes–Vire
 7th Overall An Post Ras
 9th Beaumont Trophy
2017
 3rd Lincoln Grand Prix
 5th Overall Tour de Yorkshire
2018
 2nd GP Lucien Van Impe
2019
 2nd Overall Tour of the Reservoir
 4th Tokyo 2020 Test Event
 6th Overall Tour de Yorkshire
2020
 1st Stage 6 Tour Down Under

Grand Tour general classification results timeline

References

External links

1993 births
Living people
British male cyclists
English male cyclists
Sportspeople from Wigan
21st-century British people